Viktor Udovenko (8 February 1947) is a former professional Soviet football goalkeeper and coach.

In 2011 he served as one of the Ukrainian Premier League officials.

References

External links
 

1947 births
Living people
Footballers from Kyiv
Soviet footballers
FC Dynamo-2 Kyiv players
FC Podillya Khmelnytskyi players
FC Metalist Kharkiv players
FC Torpedo Berdyansk players
Ukrainian football managers
FC Metalist Kharkiv managers
Association football goalkeepers